The 2006 Formula Renault 3.5 Series was the second Formula Renault 3.5 Series season. It began on April 29 at Zolder, Belgium and finished in Barcelona, Spain on October 29 after 17 races.

Teams and drivers

Calendar and race winners
Eight rounds formed meetings of the 2006 World Series by Renault season, with an additional round supporting the 2006 Monaco Grand Prix.

Note:

 Pastor Maldonado originally won the first race at Misano, but was disqualified for a technical infringement. His team, Draco Multiracing USA, appealed the decision, but on January 24, 2007, the Italian National Court of Appeal for Motorsport upheld the original ruling.
 Borja García originally won the second race at Spa, but was disqualified for a technical infringement. However, on October 27, 2006, a court decided to revoke the disqualification and returned the win and points to both the driver and the team. His team, RC Motorsport, did however receive a financial penalty for the infringement.

Points system

Points were awarded at the end of each race according to the following system:

In addition:

 One point was awarded for Pole position for each race
 One point was awarded for fastest lap for each race

The maximum number of points a driver could earn each weekend (except Monaco) was 34 and the maximum number for a team was 58.

Championship standings

Drivers' Championship

 Polesitter for feature race in bold
 Driver in italics has been awarded two points for fastest lap
 † — Drivers did not finish the race, but were classified as they completed over 90% of the race distance.

Notes:

 Miloš Pavlović set the fastest lap in the sprint race at Donington Park, but was not awarded the two bonus points because of a yellow flag infringement

Teams

References

Formula Renault 3.5 Series
World Series Formula V8 3.5 seasons
2006 in European sport
Renault 3.5